Paul Helbronner (24 April 1871 – 18 October 1938) was a French topographer, alpinist and geodesist who pioneered cartography of the French Alps. Pointe Helbronner in the Mont Blanc massif is named in his honor.

References

1871 births
1938 deaths
French topographers
Members of the French Academy of Sciences
Fould family